A Prince of Lovers is a 1922 British silent biographical film directed by Charles Calvert and starring Howard Gaye, Marjorie Hume and Mary Clare. The film portrays the life of the British writer Lord Byron, and was based on Alicia Ramsey's play Byron (1908).

Cast
 Howard Gaye ...  Lord Byron 
 Marjorie Hume ...  Isabella Milbanke 
 Mary Clare ...  Lady Caroline Lamb 
 David Hawthorne ...  Cam Hobhouse 
 Marjorie Day ...  Augusta Leigh 
 George Foley ...  Sir Ralph Milbanke 
 H.R. Hignett ...  Fletcher 
 Wyndham Guise ...  Joe 
 Gladys Hamilton ...  Lady Milbanke 
 W.D.C. Knox ...  Sir Walter Scott 
 Viva Birkett ...  Lady Jersey 
 Eugene Leahy ...  Tom Moore 
 Bellenden Powell ...  Prince Regent 
 Saba Raleigh ...  Mme. de Stael 
 Geoffrey Dunstan ...  Scrope Davis 
 Emmeline Ormsby ...  Mrs. Byron 
 Hector Abbas ...  Murray 
 Eileen Onions ...  Ada Augusta Byron 
 Madge Tree ...  Mrs. Clermont 
 Marie Ault ...  Nannie

References

External links

1922 films
1920s biographical drama films
1920s historical drama films
British historical drama films
British silent feature films
British biographical drama films
Films set in the 1810s
Films directed by Charles Calvert
British films based on plays
Films set in England
Cultural depictions of George IV
Cultural depictions of Lord Byron
British black-and-white films
1920s English-language films
1920s British films
Silent drama films